Evan Singleton is an American strongman competitor and former professional wrestler who carries the nickname T-Rex. In the WWE, he wrestled under the name Adam Mercer.

Singleton has won 3 Strongman competitions: 2019 Giants Live North American Open in Martinsville - Indiana, Giants Live 2021 World Open in 	Manchester - England and 2021 Arnold UK in Marston Green - England.

Professional wrestling career

When he was 18, Singleton signed for World Wrestling Entertainment and competed under the name 'Adam Mercer'.

Florida Championship Wrestling/NXT

Singleton joined WWE's developmental promotion Florida Championship Wrestling, before it became solely known as WWE NXT as Adam Mercer during March 2012. At 19 years of age, Mercer was the youngest NXT member in the program's history. Despite his impressive physical credentials, Mercer wrestled a sparse series of matches, most of which were losses to notable up-in-coming wrestlers including Big E. Langston, Brad Maddox and Erick Rowan. On August 1 in a losing fatal four-way tag match, teaming with Chad Baxter, against The Ascension (Conor O'Brian and Kenneth Cameron), Jason Jordan and Mike Dalton and Brad Maddox and Rick Victor.

Mercer's last match in WWE/NXT was on September 27 in a squash match against Erick Rowan. During the match, Mercer sustained what he described as a "serious head injury", causing him to retire. He later joined Vito LaGrasso's lawsuit against the company in 2015 (the lawsuit was thrown out by a judge in 2018.)

Strongman career
After his wrestling career ended, he had a brief spell in bodybuilding before coming across a man log-lifting at his local gym in Lancaster, struck up a conversation and within two weeks had decided strongman was his sport.

Evan’s professional debut was North Carolina’s Strongest Man and in 2018 he made his first Giants Live appearance at the North American Open. A year later he returned to record his first large contest victory.

In 2020 he made his competitive debut at World’s Strongest Man after attending the previous year as an alternate and equipment tester. A biceps injury prevented him from progressing from his heat. More bad luck followed in 2021 when, once again, his WSM aspirations were thwarted by food poisoning.

However, 2021 ultimately proved to be a huge year for Evan. Winning the Giants Live World Open and Arnold UK shows, as well as deadlifting 1,000lb (453.5kg) in competition have served to signal the arrival of a genuine World’s Strongest Man contender. 

In September 2022, Singleton suffered another biceps injury during a training session which put him out of the Giants Live World Tour Finals and Rogue Invitational that were held during October of that year. He underwent surgery to reattach his biceps tendon hoping to recover in time to prepare for the 2023 World's Strongest Man.

Bodybuilding

References

Living people
American male professional wrestlers
American strength athletes
1990 births